Kervens Fils Belfort (born 16 May 1992) is a Haitian professional footballer who plays as a forward for Malaysian club Kelantan and the Haiti national team.

Club career
Belfort has played for Tempête, Le Mans B, Le Mans, FC Sion, Grenoble, Fréjus Saint-Raphaël, Ethnikos Achna, 1461 Trabzon, Kerala Blasters, Syrianska, Zira and Jamshedpur.

Belfort was said to be popular with fans at Kerala Blasters.

After trialling with Bashundhara Kings, he signed for Abahani Limited Dhaka.

In January 2022 he signed for Kelantan.

International career
Belfort made his international debut for Haiti in 2010, and has appeared in FIFA World Cup qualifying matches.

Honours
Individual
 Caribbean Cup Golden boot: 2014

References

External links
 

1992 births
Living people
People from Ouest (department)
Haitian footballers
Association football forwards
Tempête FC players
Le Mans FC players
FC Sion players
Grenoble Foot 38 players
ÉFC Fréjus Saint-Raphaël players
Ethnikos Achna FC players
1461 Trabzon footballers
Kerala Blasters FC players
Syrianska FC players
Zira FK players
Jamshedpur FC players
Abahani Limited (Dhaka) players
Kelantan F.C. players
Ligue Haïtienne players
Ligue 2 players
Championnat National players
Cypriot First Division players
TFF First League players
Indian Super League players
Superettan players
Azerbaijan Premier League players
Bangladesh Football Premier League players
Haiti international footballers
2013 CONCACAF Gold Cup players
2014 Caribbean Cup players
2015 CONCACAF Gold Cup players
Copa América Centenario players
Haitian expatriate footballers
Haitian expatriate sportspeople in France
Haitian expatriate sportspeople in Switzerland
Haitian expatriate sportspeople in Cyprus
Haitian expatriate sportspeople in Turkey
Haitian expatriate sportspeople in India
Haitian expatriate sportspeople in Sweden
Haitian expatriate sportspeople in Azerbaijan
Haitian expatriate sportspeople in Bangladesh
Haitian expatriate sportspeople in Malaysia
Expatriate footballers in France
Expatriate footballers in Switzerland
Expatriate footballers in Cyprus
Expatriate footballers in Turkey
Expatriate footballers in India
Expatriate footballers in Sweden
Expatriate footballers in Azerbaijan
Expatriate footballers in Bangladesh
Expatriate footballers in Malaysia